Bhaiyalal Rajwade is an Indian politician who was a Bharatiya Janata Party Member of the Legislative Assembly from the Baikunthpur Vidhan Sabha constituency in the Legislative Assembly of Chhattisgarh in India.
And the bhaiya lal rajwade is the minister of the state government of Chhattisgarh.
And his ministries are following:
Labour,
Sports,
Public Grievance,
Youth Welfare of Chhattisgarh.

In the 2013 Chhattisgarh Legislative Assembly election, Rajwade defeated Indian National Congress candidate Bedanti Tivari. Rajwade had defeated Tivari in the 2008 Chhattisgarh Legislative Assembly election as well. In the Chhattisgarh Legislative Assembly election, 2003, he had lost to Congress candidate Ambika singh Dev.

References

Living people
People from Baikunthpur, Koriya
Bharatiya Janata Party politicians from Chhattisgarh
Year of birth missing (living people)
Chhattisgarh MLAs 2008–2013
Chhattisgarh MLAs 2013–2018